The 2005 Ordina Open was a combined men's and women's tennis tournament played on grass courts in Rosmalen, 's-Hertogenbosch in the Netherlands that was part of the International Series of the 2005 ATP Tour and of Tier III of the 2003 WTA Tour. The tournament was held from 13 June through 19 June 2005. Mario Ančić and Klára Koukalová won the singles titles.

Finals

Men's singles

 Mario Ančić defeated  Michaël Llodra 7–5, 6–4

Women's singles

 Klára Koukalová defeated  Lucie Šafářová 3–6, 6–2, 6–2

Men's doubles

 Cyril Suk /  Pavel Vízner defeated  Tomáš Cibulec /  Leoš Friedl 6–3, 6–4

Women's doubles

 Anabel Medina Garrigues /  Dinara Safina  defeated  Iveta Benešová /  Nuria Llagostera 6–4, 2–6, 7–6

External links
 
 ATP tournament profile
 WTA tournament profile

Ordina Open
Ordina Open
Rosmalen Grass Court Championships
2005 in Dutch tennis